Mount Tommy Thompson is a  mountain summit located in Skagit County of Washington state. It is situated eight miles southeast of the town of Marblemount, within the Glacier Peak Wilderness, on land managed by Mount Baker–Snoqualmie National Forest, on the west slopes of the North Cascades Range. The nearest higher named neighbor is Snowking Mountain,  to the southeast. Precipitation runoff from Mount Tommy Thompson drains into tributaries of the Skagit River.

Etymology
The mountain is unofficially named in honor of forest ranger Tommy Thompson (1884–1969). Born in England, his family immigrated to the United States in 1885. Tommy worked for the Forest Service from 1904 to 1943 in the Skagit district of the North Cascades. He made the first ascent of Ruby Mountain in 1916.

Climate

Mount Tommy Thompson is located in the marine west coast climate zone of western North America. Most weather fronts originate in the Pacific Ocean, and travel northeast toward the Cascade Mountains. As fronts approach the North Cascades, they are forced upward by the peaks of the Cascade Range (Orographic lift), causing them to drop their moisture in the form of rain or snowfall onto the Cascades. As a result, the west side of the North Cascades experiences high precipitation, especially during the winter months in the form of snowfall. During winter months, weather is usually cloudy, but, due to high pressure systems over the Pacific Ocean that intensify during summer months, there is often little or no cloud cover during the summer. Because of maritime influence, snow tends to be wet and heavy, resulting in high avalanche danger.

Geology
The North Cascades features some of the most rugged topography in the Cascade Range with craggy peaks and ridges, deep glacial valleys, and granite spires. Geological events occurring many years ago created the diverse topography and drastic elevation changes over the Cascade Range leading to the various climate differences.

The history of the formation of the Cascade Mountains dates back millions of years ago to the late Eocene Epoch. With the North American Plate overriding the Pacific Plate, episodes of volcanic igneous activity persisted. In addition, small fragments of the oceanic and continental lithosphere called terranes created the North Cascades about 50 million years ago.

During the Pleistocene period dating back over two million years ago, glaciation advancing and retreating repeatedly scoured the landscape leaving deposits of rock debris. The U-shaped cross section of the river valleys are a result of recent glaciation. Uplift and faulting in combination with glaciation have been the dominant processes which have created the tall peaks and deep valleys of the North Cascades area.

Gallery

References

External links

 Tommy Thompson biography: Skagitriverjournal.com
Glacier Peak Wilderness (Mt. Baker-Snoqualmie National Forest) U.S. Forest Service 
 Mount Tommy Thompson aerial photo: PBase

Cascade Range
North Cascades
Mountains of Washington (state)
Mountains of Skagit County, Washington
North Cascades of Washington (state)
North American 2000 m summits
Mount Baker-Snoqualmie National Forest